Simon Vitzthum (born 19 January 1995) is a Swiss racing cyclist, who competes on the road, track, cyclo-cross and in cross-country mountain biking.

Major results

Track

2019
 1st  Elimination race, National Track Championships
2020
 National Track Championships
1st  Scratch
2nd Points race
3rd Team pursuit
 3rd  Team pursuit, UEC European Track Championships
2021
 1st  Points race, National Track Championships
 2nd  Team pursuit, UEC European Track Championships
2022
 National Track Championships
1st  Points race
1st  Omnium
1st  Madison (with Valère Thiébaud)
1st  Individual pursuit

Road
2022
 1st Tour de Berne
 3rd Overall Tour de la Mirabelle

Cyclo-cross
2012–2013
 2nd National Junior Championships
2015–2016
 2nd National Under-23 Championships

MTB
2013
 2nd National Junior XCO Championships
2017
 2nd National Under-23 XCO Championships
2020
 1st PROFFIX Swiss Bike Cup

References

External links

1995 births
Living people
Swiss male cyclists
Swiss track cyclists
People from Arbon
Swiss mountain bikers
Sportspeople from Thurgau